The Riojan Football Federation (FRF) is the football association responsible for all competitions of any form of football developed in La Rioja. It is integrated into the Royal Spanish Football Federation and its headquarters are located in Logroño.

Competitions
 Men's
 Tercera División (Group 16)
 Regional Preferente (1 group)
 Youth
 Liga Nacional Juvenil Group V
 Divisiones Regionales
 Women's
 Divisiones Regionales

See also 
List of Spanish regional football federations

References

External links 
  

Spanish football associations
Sports organizations established in 1986
Football in La Rioja (Spain)
1986 establishments in Spain